Mallobathra perisseuta is a moth of the family Psychidae. This species is endemic to New Zealand.

References 

Moths described in 1920
Moths of New Zealand
Psychidae
Endemic fauna of New Zealand
Taxa named by Edward Meyrick
Endemic moths of New Zealand